Latastia is a genus of lizards of the family Lacertidae. Species of this genus are distributed in Africa (Egypt, Ethiopia, Djibouti, Eritrea, Guinea-Bissau, Cameroon, Kenya, Malawi, Mali, Mozambique, Niger, Zambia, Senegal, Zimbabwe, Somalia, Sudan, South Sudan, Tanzania) but one subspecies (Latastia longicaudata andersonii) lives in Yemen. Collectively, they are known as long-tailed lizards.

Etymology
Jacques von Bedriaga named this genus in honor of French herpetologist Fernand Lataste.

Diagnosis
Species of Latastia are medium to large-sized lacertids with long cylindrical tails. The unregenerated tail is up to 3.2 times longer than head and body. Eyes with movable lids. The nostril is surrounded by 3-5 scales and usually reaches the first supralabial. The collar is well marked. Ventral plates smooth and in 6 longitudinal series (sometimes 8-10 with outer plates small). The dorsal scales are homogenous, small and granular or imbricate. There are no expanded scales along the mid-back line as in Philochortus. Femoral pores are present on the inside of the thighs, more prominent in males. Tail base in males much broader than in females.

Habitat and natural history
Most long-tailed lizards of the genus Latastia inhabit well vegetated sandy or gravelly plains and large wadis in western and eastern Africa. They can be found in semidesert scrubland and deciduous Acacia-Commiphora bushland where scrubby undergrowth is plentiful, in moist savanna and high grassland  or in millet fields. Latastia boscai boscai and L. b. burii are known to occur in stony and rocky localities. Species of Latastia are distributed from sea level to 2000 m altitude.
They are diurnal, heliophilous and terrestrial, extremely wary fast-running lacertids which wander over large territories but forage mostly within vegetation cover during the heat of the day. They dart out into the sun to capture insects and other arthropods, after which they retreat into shady areas beneath bushes (thermoregulation). All species lay eggs but clutch details are known only for L. longicaudata. The population in Senegal (L. l. longicaudata) produces clutches of 5-7 eggs between July and September  while females of L. l. revoili in southeastern Kenya lay only 3-4 eggs/clutch. Hatchlings appear during the wet season.

Species

The genus is composed of 10 recognized species. Subspecies are described for Latastia boscai, L. doriai, and L. longicaudata.

Latastia boscai Bedriaga, 1884 -  Eritrea long-tailed lizard, Bosca's long-tailed lizard
L. b. boscai Bedriaga, 1884
L. b. arenicola Parker, 1942
L. b. burii Boulenger, 1907
Latastia caeruleopunctata Parker, 1935 - Parker's long-tailed lizard
Latastia cherchii Arillo, Balletto & Spanò, 1967
Latastia doriai Bedriaga, 1884 - Doria's long-tailed lizard
L. d. doriai Bedriaga, 1884
L. d. martensi Bedriaga, 1884
L. d. scorteccii Arillo, Balletto & Spanò, 1967
Latastia johnstoni Boulenger, 1907 - Johnston's long-tailed lizard, Nyasaland long-tailed lizard
Latastia longicaudata (Reuss, 1834) - southern long-tailed lizard, common long-tailed lizard
L. l. longicaudata (Reuss, 1834)
L. l. andersonii Boulenger, 1921
L. l. lanzai Arillo, Balletto & Spanò, 1967
L. l. revoili (Vaillant, 1882)
Latastia ornata Monard, 1940
Latastia petersiana Mertens, 1938 - Peters's long-tailed lizard
Latastia siebenrocki (Tornier, 1905) - Siebenrock's long-tailed lizard
Latastia taylori Parker, 1942 - Taylor's long-tailed lizard

Latastia petersiana  is the new name for Latastia carinata .

Nota bene: A binomial authority in parentheses indicates that the species was originally described in a genus other than Latastia.

References

Further reading
Anderson J (1898). "Zoology of Egypt. Volume First. Reptilia and Batrachia". London: Bernard Quaritch. 572 pp.
Arillo A, Balletto E, Spanò S (1967). "Il genere Latastia Bedriaga in Somalia ". Bollettino dei Musei e degli Istituti Biologici dell’Università di Genova 35 (229): 105-145. (L. cherchii, new species). (in Italian).
Baha El Din S (2006). A Guide to the Reptiles and Amphibians of Egypt. Cairo and New York: The American University in Cairo Press.
Bedriaga J (1884). "Die neue Lacertiden-Gattung Latastia und ihre Arten (L. Doriai n. sp., var. Martensi m., Samharica Blanf. und Boscai n. sp.)". Ann. Mus. Civ. Stor. Nat. Giacomo Doria 20: 307-324. (Latastia, new genus). (in German).
Boulenger GA (1907). "Descriptions of two new African lizards of the genus Latastia ". The Annals and Magazine of Natural History, Seventh Series 19: 392-394. (L. johnstoni, new species).
Boulenger GA (1921). [https://archive.org/stream/monographoflacer02boul#page/n3/mode/2up Monograph of the Lacertidae. Vol. II]. London: British Museum (Natural History), Department of Zoology. 451 pp.
Cissé M, Karns DR (1978). "Les Sauriens du Sénégal ". Bull. de l’I.F.A.N., ser. A., 40 (1): 144-211. (in French).
Dunger GT (1967). "The Lizards and Snakes of Nigeria. Part 2: The Lacertids of Nigeria". The Nigerian Field 32 (3): 117-131.
Loveridge A (1936). "Scientific Results of an Expedition to Rain Forest Regions in Eastern Africa, V. Reptiles". Bull. Mus. Comp. Zool. Harvard 79 (5): 209-337.
Mertens R (1938). "Über eine herpetologische Sammlung aus dem Gebiete des Njarasa-Grabens Ost-Afrikas ". Veröffentlichungen aus dem Deutschen Kolonial- und Übersee-Museum in Bremen 2 (1): 1-9 [no page numbers] (L. petersiana, nomen novum for L. carinata). (in German).
Monard A (1940). "Résultats de la mission du Dr. Monard en Guinée Portugaise 1937 – 1938 ". Arquivos do Museu Bocage, Lisbon 11: 147-182. (L. ornata, new species). (in French).
Parker HW (1935). "Two new lizards from Somaliland ". Ann. Mag. Nat. Hist., Tenth Series 16: 525-529. (L. caeruleopunctata, new species).
Parker HW (1942). "The Lizards of British Somaliland". Bulletin of the Museum of Comparative Zoology at Harvard College 91 (1): 1-101. (L. taylori, new species).
Peters WCH (1874). "Über einige neue Reptilien ( Lacerta, Eremias, Diploglossus, Euprepes, Lygosoma, Sepsina, Ablepharus, Simotes, Onychocephalus)". Monatsberichte der Königlichen Preussischen Akademie der Wissenschaften zu Berlin 1874: 368-377. (L. carinata, new species). (in German).
Reuss A (1834). "Zoologische Miscellen, Reptilien. Saurier. Batrachier ". Abhandlungen aus dem Gebiete der beschreibenden Naturgeschichte. Museum Senckenbergianum, Frankfurt am Main 1 (6): 27-62. (L. longicaudata, new species). (in German).
Spawls S, Howell KM, Drewes RC, Ashe J (2002). A Field Guide to the Reptiles of East Africa. San Diego, San Francisco, New York, Boston, London: Academic Press, Elsevier Science.
Tornier G (1905). "Schildkröten und Eidechsen aus Nordost-Afrika und Arabien. Aus Carlo v. Erlanger`s und Oscar Neumann`s Forschungsreise ". Zoologische Jahrbücher. Abteilung für Systematik, Geographie und Biologie der Tiere, Jena 22: 365-388. (L. siebenrocki, new species). (in German).
Vaillant L (1882). "Mission G. Révoil aux pays Çomalis. Reptiles et Batraciens ". In: Révoil G (1882). Faune et flore des pays Çomalis (Afrique orientale). Paris. 1-25. (in French).

External links
For photos of many species and subspecies see "Bildarchiv" under species at: http://www.lacerta.de/AS/Taxon.php?Genus=39

 
Lizard genera
Taxa named by Jacques von Bedriaga